Jon Povill (born August 29, 1946) is an American scriptwriter and television producer.  He wrote the first two drafts of the screenplay for Total Recall in the 1970s, and then took up a position on the attempted Star Trek: Phase II, becoming story editor, and penning the episode "The Child", which would later be remade as a Star Trek: The Next Generation episode.  He was ultimately credited as associate producer on Star Trek: The Motion Picture.

He worked as a script consultant and producer on Sliders (writing the episodes "Luck of the Draw", "El Sid" and "Obsession") and penned an episode of The Outer Limits in 1998.

Filmography

External links

Interview with Jon Povill at Earth Prime

1946 births
20th-century American male writers
21st-century American male writers
20th-century American screenwriters
21st-century American screenwriters
American male screenwriters
American television producers
American television writers
Living people